Yustinus Pae or Tinus Pae (born 19 June 1983) is an Indonesian professional footballer for Liga 2 club Persipura Jayapura. Mainly as a right back but also as a right winger. His younger brother Victor Pae is also a professional footballer who plays for Persewar Waropen.

Career statistics

International

Honours

Club honors
Persipura Jayapura
 Indonesia Super League: 2008–09, 2010–11
 Indonesian Community Shield: 2009
 Indonesian Inter Island Cup: 2011
 Indonesia Soccer Championship A: 2016
Dewa United
 Liga 2 third place (play-offs): 2021

Individual
 Indonesia Soccer Championship A Best XI: 2016

References

External links
 Yustinus Pae at Liga Indonesia
 

1983 births
Living people
Papuan people
People from Jayapura
Indonesian footballers
Association football midfielders
Indonesian Super League-winning players
Liga 1 (Indonesia) players
Persipura Jayapura players
Indonesia international footballers
Sportspeople from Papua
Dewa United F.C. players